Susúa may refer to:

Places
Susúa, a barrio in Sabana Grande, Puerto Rico
Susúa Alta, a barrio in Yauco, Puerto Rico
Susúa Baja, Guánica, Puerto Rico, a barrio
Susúa Baja, Yauco, Puerto Rico, a barrio